This is a list of Ohio covered bridges. There are over 125 historic wooden covered bridges in the U.S. state of Ohio. Many are still in use. Ashtabula County has 19 covered bridges, including a lattice truss bridge. Fairfield County has 18 covered bridges. The Smolen–Gulf Bridge, at 613 feet, is currently the longest multi-span covered bridge in the United States. The West Liberty Covered Bridge, at 18 feet, has been called the shortest covered bridge in the United States.

List of covered bridges

See also

List of Ashtabula County covered bridges
List of Ohio-related topics
List of bridges on the National Register of Historic Places in Ohio

References

External links

Ohio Covered Bridges List
Ohio Covered Bridge Homepage
Ohio Historic Bridge Association
Ohio Covered Bridges
"The Covered Bridges of Ohio: A Photo Guide"
The Ashtabula County (Ohio) Covered Bridge Festival
Olin's Covered Bridge Museum, Ashtabula, Ohio

Ohio, covered
Bridges, covered
Bridges, covered